This article lists the deputies of the 15th legislature of the French Fifth Republic as at the end of that legislature, elected in the 2017 legislative elections, elected in by-elections, or alternates succeeding deputies.
Former deputies not in the legislature at the end of its tenure are listed at the end of the table.
See also the List of deputies of the 16th National Assembly of France.

Parliamentary groups

List of deputies

Notes

Former deputies

References 

2017 French legislative election
15th
15th

2020s in French politics